Ensuring national security, increasing influence among its Arab neighbours and securing the return of the Golan Heights, have been the primary goals of the Syrian Arab Republic's foreign policy. At many points in its history, Syria has seen tension with its neighbours, such as Turkey, Israel, Jordan, Iraq, and Lebanon. Syria enjoyed an improvement in relations with several of the states in its region in the 21st century, prior to the Arab Spring and the Syrian Civil War.

Since the ongoing civil war, the Syrian Arab Republic's government was increasingly isolated from the countries in the region and the wider international community until 2018. Diplomatic relations were severed with several countries including: Turkey, Saudi Arabia, Canada, France, Italy, Australia, New Zealand, Sweden, Denmark, the Netherlands, Germany, United States, United Kingdom, Belgium, Spain, Mexico, Qatar and Ukraine. Syria was suspended from the Arab League in 2011 and the Organisation of Islamic Cooperation in 2012. Syria continues to foster good relations with its traditional allies, Iran and Russia.

Other countries that presently maintain good relations with Syria include China, Japan, North Korea, Vietnam, Fiji, Singapore, Sri Lanka, Laos, Myanmar, Cambodia, Thailand, Philippines, India, Pakistan, Bangladesh, Malaysia, Indonesia Brunei, Armenia, Azerbaijan, Kazakhstan, Kyrgyzstan, Uzbekistan, Turkmenistan, Mongolia, Tajikistan, Greece, Cyprus, North Macedonia, Czech Republic, Romania, Bulgaria, Hungary, Serbia, Montenegro, Vatican City and Belarus.

Syria does not maintain diplomatic relations with Israel and South Korea, but has diplomatic relations with Abkhazia and South Ossetia. Syria also maintains relations with autonomous Iraqi Kurdistan.

On 26 February 2023, Bashar al-Assad had met with Iraqi, Jordanian, Palestinian, Libyan, Egyptian and Emirati lawmakers, as well as representatives from Oman and Lebanon after more than a decade of isolation in the region.  Arab states contributed significantly to the relief effort after the 2023 Turkey–Syria earthquake. A week before, Al-Assad travelled to Oman for his first foreign visit since the quake.

Bilateral relations

Africa
Syria has relations with Angola, Cameroon, Eritrea, Ethiopia, Kenya, Mali, Mozambique, Niger, Nigeria, Senegal, South Africa, Uganda, Tanzania and Zimbabwe.

Americas
Syria has diplomatic relations with most Central and South American countries such as Antigua and Barbuda, Argentina, Bolivia, Brazil, Chile, Cuba, Ecuador, El Salvador, Grenada, Guatemala, Guyana, Nicaragua, Panama, Paraguay, Peru, Saint Vincent and the Grenadines, Saint Lucia, Federation of Saint Kitts and Nevis, Suriname, Uruguay and Venezuela.

Asia
Syria's relations with the Arab world were strained by its support for Iran during the Iran–Iraq War, which began in 1980. With the end of the war in August 1988, Syria began a slow process of reintegration with the other Arab states. In 1989, it joined with the rest of the Arab world in readmitting Egypt to the 19th Arab League Summit at Casablanca.

This decision, prompted in part by Syria's need for Arab League support of its own position in Lebanon, marked the end of the Syrian-led opposition to Egypt and the 1977–79 Sadat initiatives toward Israel, as well as the Camp David Accords. It coincided with the end of the 10-year Arab subsidy to Syria and other front-line Arab countries pledged at Baghdad in 1978. Syria re-established full diplomatic relations with Egypt in 1989. In the 1990–1991 Gulf War, Syria joined other Arab states in the US-led multinational coalition against Iraq. In 1998, Syria began a slow rapprochement with Iraq, driven primarily by economic needs. In this period, Syria continued to play an active pan-Arab role, which intensified as the Israel-Palestine peace process collapsed in September 2000 with the start of the second Palestinian uprising (Intifada) against Israel. Though it voted in favor of UNSCR 1441 in 2002, Syria was against coalition military action in Iraq in 2003. However, the Syrian government accepted UNSCR 1483 (after being absent for the actual vote), which lifted sanctions on Iraq and established a framework to assist the Iraqi people in determining their political future and rebuilding their economy. 

After the Syrian revolution in 2011, much of the Middle East condemned Syria's handling of the civil uprising, with only a few countries in the Middle East supporting Syria, most notably Iran, Iraq and Lebanon.

Europe

Greece and Cyprus re-established diplomatic relations with Syria and opened their embassies in 2021, making them the first EU countries to do so.

According to the Syrian state news agency, in November 2021, during a visit to the Syrian pavilion at Expo 2020 in Dubai, the ministerial delegation of Slovenia confirmed unofficially its interest in re-establishing relations with Syria.

Membership in international organizations
Syria is a member of the Arab Bank for Economic Development in Africa, Arab Fund for Economic and Social Development, Arab League (suspended 2011), Arab Monetary Fund (suspended 2011), Arab Parliament (suspended 2011), Arab States Broadcasting Union, ALBA (observer), Asian–African Legal Consultative Organization, Asian Parliamentary Assembly, Bureau International des Expositions, Council of Arab Economic Unity, Customs Cooperation Council, Economic and Social Council (suspended 2011), Economic and Social Commission for Western Asia, European Broadcasting Union (associate member), FEAS, Food and Agriculture Organization, Group of 24, Group of 77, International Atomic Energy Agency, International Bank for Reconstruction and Development, International Centre for Settlement of Investment Disputes, International Civil Aviation Organization, International Confederation of Arab Trade Unions, International Chamber of Commerce, International Development Association, Islamic Development Bank (suspended 2012), International Fund for Agricultural Development, International Finance Corporation, International Labour Organization, International Monetary Fund, International Maritime Organization, INTELSAT, INTERPOL, International Olympic Committee, International Organization for Standardization, IRENA (acceding), International Solar Alliance, International Telecommunication Union, Multilateral Investment Guarantee Agency, Non-Aligned Movement, Organization of Arab Petroleum Exporting Countries, Organisation of Islamic Cooperation (suspended 2012), Organisation for the Prohibition of Chemical Weapons (joined 2013, suspended 2021), OTIF, Parliamentary Assembly of the Mediterranean, UN, UN Commission on Human Rights, UN Conference on Trade and Development, UNESCO, UN Industrial Development Organization, UN Relief and Works Agency for Palestine Refugees in the Near East, Union for the Mediterranean (suspended 2011), Universal Postal Union, World Bank, World Court, World Customs Organization, World Federation of Trade Unions, World Health Organization, WHO Regional Office for the Eastern Mediterranean, World Intellectual Property Organization, World Meteorological Organization, World Tourism Organization and International Federation of Red Cross and Red Crescent Societies.

Syria's two-year term as a nonpermanent member of the UN Security Council ended in December 2003. Syria was elected to the executive of the World Health Organization in 2021.

Arab League
Syria has been temporarily suspended from the Arab League since the beginning of the Syrian Civil War. On 26 March 2013, at the Arab league summit in Doha, the League recognised the National Coalition for Syrian Revolutionary and Opposition Forces, as the legitimate representatives of the Syrian people. The National Coalition was henceforth granted Damascus' seat at the summit. This act of recognition was opposed by Algeria, Iraq & Lebanon. On 9 March 2014, secretary general Nabil al-Arabi said that Syria's seat would remain vacant until the opposition completes the formation of its institutions. In late 2018, Egypt, Tunisia and Morocco began lobbying for Syria's return to the League.

In December 2018, after American president Donald Trump announced the partial withdrawal of U.S. troops from Syria, some countries initiated reopening of their diplomatic relations with Syria. Diplomatic relations have returned with Iraq, Egypt (after 3 July 2013), Tunisia, UAE, Jordan (after 2021), Lebanon (after 2021), Algeria, Mauritania (after 2018), Bahrain (after 2018), Kuwait (after 2018), Libya,  Oman, Comoros, Sudan (after 2018), Yemen, Somalia and Palestine.

Following the visit of Sudanese President Omar al-Bashir, the Arab League initiated the process of readmission of the Syrian Arab Republic to the organization, while the United Arab Emirates reopened their embassy in Syria on 27 December, and Bahrain announced its intentions to reopen their embassies.

On 26 February 2023, President Bashar al-Assad had met with Iraqi, Jordanian, Palestinian, Libyan, Egyptian and Emirati speakers of legislative bodies, as well as representatives from Oman and Lebanon on behalf of Arab Inter-Parliamentary Union, to discuss further cooperation between the Arab states and Syria. 

After the devastating 2023 Turkey–Syria earthquake, the Saudis, Emirati and Algerians contributed significantly to the relief effort. A week before, Al-Assad travelled to Oman for his first foreign visit since the quake.

International disputes
Western Golan Heights with Israel; 
dispute with upstream riparian Turkey over Turkish water development plans for the Tigris and Euphrates rivers
separation of the Hatay State and subsequent incorporation into the Turkish state
dispute with Turkey concerning the Turkish occupation of North Syria
dispute with the United States over the American-led intervention and occupation of Syrian territory
ilicit drugs: a transit point for opiates and hashish bound for regional and Western markets, as well as captagon

See also

 List of diplomatic missions in Syria
 List of diplomatic missions of Syria
 Foreign relations of the Syrian Opposition
 International recognition of the Syrian National Council
 Sanctions against Syria

References

External links
  Ministry of Foreign Affairs
 UNRWA Commissioner-General Visits Syria
 EU Neighbourhood Info Centre: Country profile of Syria

Further reading